The 2007 Washington State Cougars football team represented Washington State University in the 2007 NCAA Division I FBS football season. The team was led by fifth-year head coach Bill Doba and played its home games on campus at Martin Stadium in Pullman, with one at Qwest Field in Seattle.

The 2007 Apple Cup was played a week later than normal to allow for both Washington and Washington State to have a bye, as neither had one in 2006.  This marked the first time the Apple Cup has been played after Thanksgiving since 1978.

Three days after leading the Cougars to a 42–35 victory in the Apple Cup, head coach Bill Doba was fired on November 26. Doba posted a 30–29 record during his 5 seasons as head coach; and led the Cougars to only 1 bowl game, a 28–20 victory over Texas in the Holiday Bowl in his first season.

Schedule

Personnel

Game summaries

Wisconsin

San Diego State

Idaho

USC

Arizona

Arizona State

Oregon

UCLA

California

Stanford

Oregon State

Washington

100th Apple Cup

References

Washington State
Washington State Cougars football seasons
Washington State Cougars football